Hand of Glory is a studio album by Royal Trux. It is composed of recordings made 1985 to 1989 and was released by Drag City in 2002.

Track listing

References

External links
 

2002 albums
Royal Trux albums
Drag City (record label) albums
Domino Recording Company albums